A University College Entrance Program (UCEP) is an education program in Canada, designed for adults who were unable to successfully complete Grade 12 level courses, but wish to go into a post secondary education. Many schools offer such a program, which allows a student to gain the necessary prerequisite courses.

UCEP programs helps students get the matriculation courses they need to go on to college and university study, giving them the skills, experience and knowledge that are essential for post-secondary success. Students may also enjoy field trips, theatre productions, and exposure to different area colleges and universities to become familiar with post-secondary education. 

Similarly, UCEP students may receive individualized counseling support to help them work through any barriers to reaching their academic potential. Often, this means overcoming obstacles that prevented these individuals from completing their Grade 12 level courses in the first place.

External links
Schools:

Education in Canada